Barry Richardson may refer to:

Barry Richardson (American football) (born 1986), American football offensive tackle
Barry Richardson (Australian footballer) (born 1946), Australian rules footballer 
Barry Richardson (English footballer) (born 1969), English footballer